The Union of Agriculture, Food and Allied Industries (ANG) was a trade union representing workers in agriculture, food processing and other related industries, in Austria.

The union was founded in 1991, when the Union of Agricultural and Forestry Workers merged with the Union of Workers in Food and Allied Industries.  Like its predecessors, it affiliated to the Austrian Trade Union Federation.  By 1998, it had 44,432 members.

In 2002, the union began sharing offices in Vienna with the Metal-Textile Union, and on 10 May 2006, the two unions merged, forming the Metal-Textile-Food Union.

Presidents
1991: Leopold Simperl
2004: Rainer Wimmer

References

Agriculture and forestry trade unions
Food processing trade unions
Trade unions established in 1991
Trade unions disestablished in 2006
Trade unions in Austria
1991 establishments in Austria
2006 disestablishments in Austria